Enrico Benedetti (16 August 1940 – 21 December 1996) was an Italian ice hockey player who competed at the 1964 Winter Olympics. Between 1958 and 1974 he won multiple national titles with SG Cortina.

References

1940 births
1996 deaths
Italian ice hockey forwards
Ice hockey players at the 1964 Winter Olympics
Olympic ice hockey players of Italy
SG Cortina players